This is a list of 136 species in Erythridula, a genus of leafhoppers in the family Cicadellidae.

Erythridula species

 Erythridula abolla (McAtee, 1920) c g
 Erythridula acicularis (Beamer, 1932) c g
 Erythridula acutalis (Ross & DeLong, 1953) c g
 Erythridula aenea (Beamer, 1930) c g
 Erythridula aesculella (Ross & DeLong, 1953) c g
 Erythridula afflicta (Beamer, 1935) c g
 Erythridula albescens (Beamer, 1930) c g
 Erythridula amabilis (McAtee, 1924) c g
 Erythridula ampla (Knull, 1951) c g
 Erythridula angularis (Beamer, 1930) c g
 Erythridula anomala (Knull, 1946) c g
 Erythridula apta (Beamer, 1935) c g
 Erythridula aspera (Beamer & Griffith, 1935) c g
 Erythridula atrimucronata (Beamer, 1930) c g
 Erythridula autenae (Johnson, 1935) c g
 Erythridula barbarae (Hepner, 1978) c g
 Erythridula beckiae (Hepner, 1978) c g
 Erythridula bicornis (Beamer, 1930) c g
 Erythridula bitincta (McAtee, 1926) c g b
 Erythridula brundusa (Robinson, 1924) c g b
 Erythridula canadensis Dmitriev & Dietrich, 2009 c g
 Erythridula cauta (Beamer, 1935) c g
 Erythridula celebrata (Johnson, 1935) c g
 Erythridula clavata (DeLong, 1916) c g b
 Erythridula coarctata (Beamer, 1930) c g
 Erythridula complicata (Johnson, 1935) c g
 Erythridula cornipes (Beamer, 1930) c g
 Erythridula cotidiana (Beamer, 1930) c g b
 Erythridula crataegi (Johnson, 1935) c g b
 Erythridula crevecoeuri (Gillette, 1898) c g b
 Erythridula crossi (Hepner, 1976) c g
 Erythridula cruciformis (Beamer, 1930) c g
 Erythridula cuneata (Beamer, 1930) c g
 Erythridula diffisa (Beamer, 1930) c g b
 Erythridula divisa (McAtee, 1924) c g b
 Erythridula dolosa (Beamer & Griffith, 1935) c g
 Erythridula dorsalis  b
 Erythridula dowelli (Beamer, 1932) c g
 Erythridula dunni (Hepner, 1976) c g
 Erythridula electa (McAtee, 1920) c g
 Erythridula eluta (McAtee, 1920) c g
 Erythridula enata (Knull, 1951) c g
 Erythridula falcata (Beamer, 1930) c g
 Erythridula freta (Knull, 1951) c g
 Erythridula frisoni (Ross & DeLong, 1953) c g
 Erythridula fulvocephala (Robinson, 1924) c g
 Erythridula fumida (Gillette, 1898) c g b
 Erythridula funesta (Beamer, 1930) c g
 Erythridula furcillata (Beamer, 1930) c g
 Erythridula gleditsia (Beamer, 1930) c g
 Erythridula hamata (Beamer, 1930) c g b
 Erythridula harpax (Beamer, 1930) c g
 Erythridula haspata (Ross & DeLong, 1953) c g
 Erythridula herberti (Hepner, 1976) c g
 Erythridula idonea (Beamer, 1935) c g
 Erythridula ilicis (Ross, 1953) c g
 Erythridula inconspicua (Johnson, 1935) c g
 Erythridula infinita (Beamer, 1930) c g b
 Erythridula insigna (Beamer & Griffith, 1935) c g b
 Erythridula intricata (Johnson, 1935) c g
 Erythridula jocosa (Beamer, 1935) c g
 Erythridula jonesi (Hepner, 1976) c g
 Erythridula juglandis (Knull & Auten, 1938) c g
 Erythridula juncea (Beamer, 1937) c g
 Erythridula kanza (Robinson, 1924) c g b
 Erythridula lasteri (Hepner, 1977) c g
 Erythridula lawsoniana (Baker, 1926) c g
 Erythridula lemnisca (McAtee, 1926) c g
 Erythridula lloydi (Hepner, 1977) c g
 Erythridula lucileae (Hepner, 1976) c g
 Erythridula lyratae (Ross & DeLong, 1953) c g
 Erythridula magnacalx (Beamer, 1930) c g
 Erythridula malleiformis (Beamer, 1930) c g
 Erythridula mansueta (Beamer, 1935) c g
 Erythridula martini (Hepner, 1976) c g
 Erythridula meridiana (Hepner, 1977) c g
 Erythridula minima (Johnson, 1935) c g
 Erythridula minuta (Johnson, 1935) c g b
 Erythridula modica (Beamer, 1930) c g
 Erythridula morrisi (Hepner, 1977) c g
 Erythridula nava (Beamer, 1935) c g
 Erythridula nigriphylla (Hepner, 1977) c g
 Erythridula nitida (Beamer, 1935) c g b
 Erythridula noeva (Gillette, 1898) c g b
 Erythridula nondescripta (Johnson, 1935) c g
 Erythridula normanti (Hepner, 1976) c g
 Erythridula obliqua (Say, 1825) c g
 Erythridula obvia (Beamer, 1930) c g
 Erythridula occidua (Beamer & Griffith, 1935) c g
 Erythridula ohioensis (Knull, 1945) c g b
 Erythridula parsonsi (Hepner, 1976) c g
 Erythridula parvispicata (Beamer, 1930) c g
 Erythridula penelutea (Beamer, 1930) c g
 Erythridula penenoeva (Beamer, 1930) c g b
 Erythridula penobliqua (Beamer, 1930) c g
 Erythridula perita (Beamer, 1935) c g
 Erythridula pfrimmeri (Hepner, 1977) c g b
 Erythridula planerae Dmitriev & Dietrich, 2009 c g
 Erythridula plena (Beamer, 1930) c g b
 Erythridula praecisa (Knull, 1946) c g b
 Erythridula quadrata (Beamer, 1930) c g
 Erythridula repleta (Johnson, 1935) c g
 Erythridula rhododendronae (Hepner, 1978) c g
 Erythridula rubens (Beamer, 1930) c g
 Erythridula rubrataeniensis (Beamer, 1930) c g b
 Erythridula rubroscuta (Gillette, 1898) c g
 Erythridula rubrotincta (Johnson, 1935) c g
 Erythridula rufostigmosa (Beamer, 1930) c g b
 Erythridula rugosae (Ross & DeLong, 1953) c g
 Erythridula sagittata (Beamer, 1930) c g
 Erythridula scissa (Beamer, 1930) c g
 Erythridula scytha (Auten & Johnson, 1936) c g
 Erythridula similalis (Ross & DeLong, 1953) c g b
 Erythridula sincera (Johnson, 1935) c g
 Erythridula sinua (Johnson, 1935) c g
 Erythridula spatulata (Beamer, 1930) c
 Erythridula spearca (Johnson & Auten, 1936) c g
 Erythridula stolata (McAtee, 1920) c g b
 Erythridula stylata (Johnson, 1935) c g
 Erythridula tenebrosa (Knull, 1946) c g b
 Erythridula tenuispica (Beamer, 1930) c g
 Erythridula tolerata (Knull, 1951) c g
 Erythridula torva (Beamer, 1935) c g
 Erythridula tridens (Beamer, 1930) c g
 Erythridula ulmalatae (Ross & DeLong, 1953) c g
 Erythridula ulmosa (Ross & DeLong, 1953) c g b
 Erythridula unicuspidis (Beamer, 1930) c g
 Erythridula varia (McAtee, 1920) c g
 Erythridula verdana (Ross & DeLong, 1953) c g b
 Erythridula victorialis (Knull, 1946) c g
 Erythridula vinaria (Beamer, 1930) c g
 Erythridula volucris (Beamer, 1930) c g b
 Erythridula whitti (Hepner, 1976) c g
 Erythridula wyatti Dmitriev & Dietrich, 2009 c g
 Erythridula wysongi (Ross & DeLong, 1953) c g
 Erythridula zephyr (Ross & DeLong, 1953) c g

Data sources: i = ITIS, c = Catalogue of Life, g = GBIF, b = Bugguide.net

References

Erythridula